Jean de Dieu Makiese (28 May 1952 – 11 August 2007), popularly known as Madilu System, was a Congolese rumba singer and songwriter, born in what was then Léopoldville, Belgian Congo. He was once a member of the seminal band TPOK Jazz which dominated the Congolese scene from 1960s through 1980s.

Music career
Beginning as a teenager in 1969, Madilu sang with a series of bands: "Orchestre Symba", "Orchestre Bamboula", headed by Papa Noel,  "Festival des Maquisards", led by Sam Mangwana, and Fiesta Popular. In 1973, under the new name Bialu thanks to President Mobutu's "authenticité" campaign, he formed the band Bakuba Mayopi which had a hit in 1976 with the song "Pamba-Pamba," after which he left to form a new group called Orchestre Pamba-Pamba.

However, it was not until Madilu teamed up with Franco, joining his TPOK Jazz in April 1980, that he became a Congolese and International star. He was described as the band's "brightest vocal talent" during its 1980s heyday.  Franco is the one who nicknamed him Madilu System, a name that stuck.  Madilu's first hit with TPOK Jazz was "Mamou (Tu Vois)," which became a hit in 1984.  He sang in a duet with Franco on the band's biggest hit, "Mario."

In the 1990s, following the collapse of TPOK Jazz a few years after the death of its leader Franco in 1989, Madilu began his solo career by issuing an album called Sans Commentaire.

At the beginning of August 2007, Madilu traveled to Kinshasa to shoot videos for his new songs. He collapsed on Friday, 10 August 2007. He was taken to the University Hospital in Kinshasa, where he died the next morning, Saturday 11 August 2007.  His last album, La Bonne Humeur, was released posthumously.

Discography
 Sans Commentaire (1993)
 Album '95 (1995) 
 L'eau (1999)
 Pouvoir (2000)
 Tenant du Titre (2003)
 Bonheur (2004)
 La Bonne Humeur (2007)

See also
 Franco Luambo Makiadi
 Sam Mangwana
 Josky Kiambukuta
 TPOK Jazz

References

External links
 Madilu System Biography and Discography

20th-century Democratic Republic of the Congo male singers
1952 births
2007 deaths
TPOK Jazz members
21st-century Democratic Republic of the Congo male singers
21st-century Democratic Republic of the Congo people